Bobby Lynn Bryant (born August 7, 1992) is an American professional boxer.

Amateur career
Bryant was born in Memphis, Tennessee. He had a record of 112-17 during his amateur career. He won a gold medal at the 2007 National Jr. Golden Gloves Championships and a silver at the 2008 National Jr. Golden Gloves Championships.

Professional career
In June 2011, Bryant beat the veteran Marteze Logan by unanimous decision at the Civic Center in Rayne, Louisiana.

References

External links

Light-middleweight boxers
1992 births
Living people
Boxers from Tennessee
Sportspeople from Memphis, Tennessee
American male boxers